Joop Ave (5 December 1934 – 5 February 2014) was the Indonesian Minister of Tourism, Post and Telecommunications (MENPARPOSTEL) between 1993 and 1998.

Born in Yogyakarta to Dutch ancestors, he served in the Fourth Development Cabinet. He was active for 20 years in the field of protocol. He was the Director General of Tourism (1982) and fluent in four foreign languages; namely, English, Dutch, French and German.

Ave studied at the Foreign Service Academy (1957) and was brought up by his mother, who lives in Los Angeles, US. He studied at the University of the Philippines, Manila, but did not complete the course.

He began his career as an author and broadcaster on the French program RRI, Jakarta (1957) before being hired by the Ministry of Foreign Affairs (1957). Ten years later, he was in charge of the Consulate General of Indonesia in New York City, US (1967), Secretary I (1970) and Consular Affairs (1972).

Ave served as the Head of Household at the Presidential Palace from 1972 until 1978. He was awarded the title of Raden Mas Kanjeng Haryo Condronegoro of Mangkunagara VIII. At the time of the Surakarta palace fire, he was one of a special group that was active in researching the cause of the blaze.

Before being appointed as Director General of Tourism (1982), he served as Director General of Protocol and Consular Affairs Department of the period (1978–1982). In addition to serving in the bureaucracy, he also served as Chairman of the ASEAN Sub-Committee on Tourism (1983–1986) and the PATA Board of Directors (1984–1986).

He was also a co-editor of a number of books about Indonesia and tourism.

Ave wrote about Indonesian art and craft.

Ave died at Mount Elizabeth Hospital, Singapore on 5 February 2014, after a long illness. He was 79. He was cremated three days later in Nusa Dua, Bali.

Official postings
Drafting programme and French broadcaster RRI, Jakarta (1957)
Servant Ministry of Foreign Affairs (1957)
Consul General in New York (1967)
Secretary I (1970)
Consular (1972)
Head of the presidential palace in Jakarta (1972–1978)
Director General of Protocol and Consular Department of Foreign Affairs (1978–1982)
Director General of Tourism (1982–1988)
Minister of Tourism Development Cabinet VI (17 March 1993 – 14 March 1998)

Notes

1934 births
2014 deaths
Indo people
Indonesian politicians
Government ministers of Indonesia
People from Yogyakarta
Indonesian people of Dutch descent